Xcel Energy Center is a multipurpose arena in Saint Paul, Minnesota, United States. Completed in 2000, it is named for its locally based corporate sponsor Xcel Energy. With an official capacity of 17,954, the arena has four spectator levels: one suite level and three for general seating. The building is home to the NHL's Minnesota Wild.

The arena is owned by the city of Saint Paul and operated by the Wild's parent company, Minnesota Sports & Entertainment. It is on the same block of downtown St. Paul as the RiverCentre convention facility, the Roy Wilkins Auditorium, and the Ordway Center for the Performing Arts, and shares a single indoor access area with the RiverCentre and Roy Wilkins Auditorium. It hosted the 2008 Republican National Convention.

History
The arena opened on September 29, 2000. It was built on the site of the demolished St. Paul Civic Center. The push for a new arena in Saint Paul grew after the National Hockey League's Minnesota North Stars moved to Dallas. Saint Paul courted the Hartford Whalers and Winnipeg Jets under Mayor Norm Coleman, but the Civic Center was an obstacle to both deals.

In order to get an NHL expansion team, Saint Paul needed to build a new arena. After several failed attempts to get funding, the state funded the project in April 1998. It gave Saint Paul a no-interest loan of $65 million for the $130 million project, though it forgave $17 million of that in exchange for having high school sports championships played at the arena.

The Minnesota Wild played their first game at the arena on October 11, 2000, against the Philadelphia Flyers. It was a 3–3 tie. Peter White scored the first goal in the arena while Darby Hendrickson scored the first goal for the Wild. The Wild's first win at the arena came on October 18, 2000, when they defeated the Tampa Bay Lightning 6–5. Not until April 14, 2003, did the Wild play a playoff game at the arena. In that game, the Wild suffered a 3–0 loss to the Colorado Avalanche. On April 21, 2003, the Wild won their first playoff game 3–2 on an overtime game-winner by Richard Park.

In 2004, ESPN named the Xcel Center the best overall sports venue in the U.S. The 10 millionth person passed through its gates on July 3, 2007.

In 2006, the Twin Cities were selected as the hosting metropolis for the 2008 Republican National Convention, and the arena was chosen as the main venue. The convention was held there on September 1-4, 2008.

In 2010, ESPN magazine listed a Minnesota Wild game at Xcel Energy Center as the third-best stadium experience in North America. First on the list were the Minnesota Twins and Target Field.

On April 26, 2015, the Wild won its first playoff series at the arena, defeating the St. Louis Blues 4–1 in game six of the Western Conference Quarterfinals.

The arena hosted the Vote for Change Tour on October 5, 2004, featuring performances by Bright Eyes, R.E.M. and Bruce Springsteen & The E Street Band (with special guest John Fogerty and unannounced guest Neil Young).

The Minnesota Lynx of the WNBA used Xcel Energy Center during the 2016 WNBA Playoffs, and played a full season there in 2017, as their home arena, Minneapolis's Target Center, was undergoing renovation.

Features
The concourse areas contain hockey jerseys from every Minnesota high school on the walls, reflecting the "State of Hockey." Surrounding the arena at all four corners are "crow's nests." One features an organ and is played during Wild games. The second features a lighthouse that houses a foghorn that is blasted when the team takes the ice before games, for all Wild goals, and after a victory. The third is used for the Wild's drum line. The fourth provides an additional stage for various uses.

Before it opened, the arena installed an integrated scoring, video, information and advertising display system by Daktronics. The center ice display was replaced in the summer of 2014. In 2015 the arena began replacing every seat in the building with cushioned seating. This was finished by early 2016.

Attendance records
March 6, 2015: 21,609 fans attended the 2015 State Boys' Hockey Tournament Class AA semifinals at Xcel Energy Center, setting a new record for the largest crowd to ever attend an indoor hockey game in the state of Minnesota.
March 9, 2012: The Minnesota State High School League Boys' hockey tournament again set a new attendance record during the 2012 AA semifinal session. Hill-Murray and Moorhead played in the first game followed by Benilde St-Margaret's and Lakeville South in front of a crowd of 19,893.
March 8, 2008: The Minnesota State High School League Boys' hockey tournament set a new attendance record during the AA semifinal session. Edina and Benilde-St. Margaret's played in the first game followed by Roseau and Hill-Murray in front of a crowd of 19,559.
February 8, 2004: The NHL All-Star Game set a record for attendance at a hockey game in Minnesota at 19,434.
The record attendance for a Wild game was set May 6, 2014 at 19,416, against the Chicago Blackhawks.
On October 28, 2003, Shania Twain set the arena's single-night concert attendance record of 20,554.
On March 17, 2007, 19,463 spectators watched the final game of the WCHA Final Five tournament, the largest crowd ever for an indoor United States college ice hockey game (i.e. not including games held in football stadiums such as the Cold War).
On November 3 & 4, 2012, Madonna performed two sold-out shows on her record-breaking MDNA Tour.
On January 19, 2013, 19,298 fans watched the Wild defeat the Colorado Avalanche in the first game after the shortened 2012–13 season. It also marked the debuts of signees Zach Parise and Ryan Suter.
Every Wild game at the Xcel Energy Center sold out until October 16, 2010, totaling 400 consecutive home games.

Sustainability efforts 
The campus of Xcel Energy Center, Saint Paul RiverCentre, and The Roy Wilkins Auditorium has three world-class certifications: 
 Green Globes Certification – November 2017
 LEED Platinum Certification – September 2019
 Event Industry Council (EIC) Sustainable Event Standards (SES) – Gold Certification – November 2020

The Xcel Energy Center and Saint Paul RiverCentre campus is the world's first complex to receive all three of those certifications. The road to achieving them took several years. Some of the steps taken to achieve these awards are:
60% of all waste is recycled
40% of staff commute by bus, bike, carpool or an efficient vehicle
90% of cleaning products meet green standards

In addition to the efforts made by staff, Xcel Energy Center has partnered with the NHL to join Change the Course, a national initiative promoting water conservation and restoration. To highlight its achievements, the Xcel Energy Center produced Exceptionally Green: Minnesota Wild, Saint Paul RiverCentre and Xcel Energy Center.

Other events
 Xcel Energy Center is the site of the Minnesota State High School League (MSHSL) Girls Volleyball State Tournament, Wrestling State Tournament, and the Boys and Girls Hockey State Tournaments. 
 It hosted the 2002, 2011, and 2018 NCAA Frozen Four.
 The National Lacrosse League's Minnesota Swarm played in the arena from January 2005 until they moved to Georgia in 2015.
 The venue formerly hosted the Big Ten Men's Ice Hockey Tournament, alternating with Joe Louis Arena in Detroit. As of 2018, it is host venue of the NCHC Frozen Faceoff.

Concerts
2000s
2000

2001

2002

2003

2004

Funding
In 1998, the state made a $65 million interest-free loan toward construction of the $130 million arena, $17 million of which was forgiven when the team agreed to allow amateur and public events. That left a loan of $48 million.

In 2013, the state legislature passed an omnibus jobs, housing and commerce bill that included forgiveness of the remaining $32.7 million loan to Xcel Energy Center.

Under the terms of the forgiveness deal in this bill, St. Paul's annual loan payment was reduced by $500,000 in 2014 and again in 2015. The balance of the loan was forgiven in 2016. The city still owes $56.8 million in bonds on the arena, of the $72.7 million it borrowed in 1998.

References

External links

Xcel Energy Center official website

Sports venues completed in 2000
Indoor lacrosse venues in the United States
Minnesota Wild
National Hockey League venues
Sports venues in Saint Paul, Minnesota
College ice hockey venues in the United States
Xcel Energy
Indoor ice hockey venues in Saint Paul, Minnesota
2000 establishments in Minnesota
Indoor arenas in Minnesota